Paralimnophila emarginata is a crane fly species in the genus Paralimnophila. It is found in Chile.

References

Limoniidae
Diptera of South America
Insects described in 1981
Endemic fauna of Chile